Poland participated in the Eurovision Song Contest 2005 with the song "Czarna dziewczyna" written by Łukasz Lazer, Michał Szymański and Ivan Komarenko. The song was performed by Ivan and Delfin. In December 2004, the Polish broadcaster Telewizja Polska (TVP) announced that the Polish entry for the 2005 contest in Kyiv, Ukraine would be selected through an internal selection. "Czarna dziewczyna" performed by Ivan and Delfin was announced as the Polish entry on 29 January 2005 during the TVP1 programme Stratosfera.

Poland competed in the semi-final of the Eurovision Song Contest which took place on 25 May 2010. Performing as the closing entry during the show in position 25, "Czarna dziewczyna" was not announced among the top 10 entries of the first semi-final and therefore did not qualify to compete in the final. It was later revealed that Poland placed eleventh out of the 25 participating countries in the semi-final with 81 points.

Background 

Poland's highest placement in the contest, to this point, has been second place, which the nation achieved with its debut entry in 1994 with the song "To nie ja!" performed by Edyta Górniak. Poland has only, thus far, reached the top ten on one other occasion, when Ich Troje performing the song "Keine Grenzen – Żadnych granic" finished seventh in 2003. Poland's 2004 entry, "Love Song" performed by Blue Café, placed seventeenth in the final.

The Polish national broadcaster, Telewizja Polska (TVP), broadcasts the event within Poland and organises the selection process for the nation's entry. TVP confirmed Poland's participation in the 2005 Eurovision Song Contest on 13 December 2004. In 2003 and 2004, TVP organised televised national finals that featured a competition among several artists and songs in order to select the Polish entry for the Eurovision Song Contest. However, on 19 December 2004, TVP announced that the Polish entry for the 2005 Eurovision Song Contest would be selected via an internal selection. The last time the Polish entry was selected internally was in 2001.

Before Eurovision

Internal selection 
TVP announced in December 2004 that the Polish entry for the Eurovision Song Contest 2005 would be selected via an internal selection. The broadcaster opened a submission period for interested artists and songwriters to submit their entries between 28 December 2004 and 20 January 2005. TVP received 64 submissions at the closing of the deadline. A 28-member selection committee reviewed the received submissions and selected the Polish entry. The selection committee consisted of:

 Grzegorz Brzozowicz – Journalist and music reviewer
 Maciej Chmiel – Journalist, music reviewer and TV producer
 Jacek Cieślak – Rzeczpospolita
 Janusz Czajka – Wirtualna Polska
 Adam Czerwiński – Radio RMF FM
 Tomasz Deszczyński – OGAE Poland
 Alina Dragan – Polish Radio
 Mariusz Duma – Disco Music Club
 Agustin Egurrola – Dancer and choreographer
 Filip Eichholzer – VIVA Polska
 Leszek Gnoiński – Gazeta Muzyczna
 Wojciech Jagielski – Radio ZET
 Janusz Kosiński – Journalist
 Zygmunt Kukla – Conductor, composer
 Robert Leszczyński – Journalist
 Anna Maliszewska – Producer, screenwriter, director
 Piotr Metz – MTV Polska
 Lech Nowicki – TVP Polonia
 Aleksander Rogoziński – Radio Kolor
 Robert Sankowski – Journalist
 Tomasz Słoń – Interia.pl
 Michał Szcześniak – Director and screenwriter
 Krzysztof Szewczyk – TVP2
 Maria Szabłowska – Polish Radio
 Paweł Sztompke – Polish Radio
 Łukasz Wawro – Onet.pl
 Andrzej Witkowski – TVP1
 Michał Żołądkowski – Radio WAWA
On 29 January 2005 during the TVP1 programme Stratosfera, hosted by Artur Orzech, it was announced that Ivan and Delfin would represent Poland in the Eurovision Song Contest 2005 with the song "Czarna dziewczyna", written by Łukasz Lazer, Michał Szymański and Ivan Komarenko himself. In addition to the presentation of the song, 1995 Polish Eurovision entrant Justyna Steczkowska, 2003 Polish Eurovision entrants Ich Troje and 2004 Polish Eurovision entrants Blue Café performed as guests during the show.

At Eurovision
According to Eurovision rules, all nations with the exceptions of the host country, the "Big Four" (France, Germany, Spain and the United Kingdom) and the ten highest placed finishers in the 2004 contest are required to qualify from the semi-final on 19 May 2005 in order to compete for the final on 21 May 2005; the top ten countries from the semi-final progress to the final. On 22 March 2005, a special allocation draw was held which determined the running order for the semi-final and Poland was set to perform last in position 25, following the entry from Denmark. At the end of the semi-final, Poland was not announced among the top 10 entries in the semi-final and therefore failed to qualify to compete in the final. It was later revealed that Poland placed eleventh in the semi-final, receiving a total of 81 points.

The semi-final and the final were broadcast in Poland on TVP1 and TVP Polonia with commentary by Artur Orzech. The Polish spokesperson, who announced the Polish votes during the final, was Maciej Orłoś.

Voting 
Below is a breakdown of points awarded to Poland and awarded by Poland in the semi-final and grand final of the contest. The nation awarded its 12 points to Hungary in the semi-final and to Ukraine in the final of the contest.

Points awarded to Poland

Points awarded by Poland

References

2005
Countries in the Eurovision Song Contest 2005
Eurovision
Eurovision